Liverpool Castle was a castle in Liverpool, England, that stood from the early 13th century to the early 18th century (1237–1726).

Construction
The castle was probably erected in the 1230s, between 1232 and 1235, under the orders of William de Ferrers, 4th Earl of Derby. No records of the castle construction survive, except the licence to fortify de Ferrers received in 1235. Nearby in West Derby, there had long been a castle, which was taken by the Ferrerses in 1232, but by 1296 it lay in ruins. The castle in Liverpool was built to protect King John's new port, and was sited at the top of modern-day Lord Street, the highest point in the city which overlooks the Pool. This corresponds to present day Derby Square (Queen Victoria Monument), near the city centre.

Description
The castle was built on top of a plateau, which had been specially constructed, and a moat measuring 20 yards (18 m) was cut out of solid rock. The main building of the castle consisted of the gatehouse flanked by two towers at the north-east corner which faced Castle Street; three round towers at the three remaining corners, one being added at a later date than the others, in 1442. Four curtain walls connected the four towers; the northern and southern walls were recessed to allow them to be commanded from the towers. Inside the castle were a hall and chapel, which were connected to the south-western tower, and a brewhouse and bakehouse. There was also a passage which ran under the moat toward the edge of the river. The courtyard was divided by a wall built running from the north wall to the south wall. Underneath the castle walls stood a dovecot, and an orchard ran from the castle to the Pool in the east.

History

Upon the death of William de Ferrers in 1247, his son William inherited both Liverpool Castle and West Derby Castle. The heir to the title was Robert de Ferrers. He rebelled against King Henry III and was arrested and held in the Tower of London and then Windsor Castle. His lands and title were removed and taken back by the Crown. Henry III presented the land, along with Lancaster to his second son Edmund. Mary de Ferrers, wife of the forfeited earl and niece to the King, was ordered to surrender the castle in July 1266. The lands were then held by Edmund and passed onto his successor Thomas.

It was under the administration of Thomas that Liverpool progressed steadily. The earl did not bestow much worth on the borough of Liverpool and in 1315, he granted the castle and the land to Robert de Holland. The creation of the patronage of Robert de Holland caused some unrest among other landowners, and on 25 October in the same year Adam Banastre, Henry de Lea and William de Bradshagh (Bradshaw) banded together (the Banastre Rebellion) and launched an attack on the castle, and were defeated within an hour. This is the only recorded attack on the castle to happen before the English Civil War. Between 1315 and 1323, the borough of Liverpool returned to the hands of the Crown. In 1323, King Edward II visited the town and lodged at the castle from 24 to 30 October. Early in the reign of Edward III, the king utilised Liverpool as a port of embarkation in his wars with Scotland and Ireland. In 1327, Edward ordered the constable of the castle to give shelter to men fleeing from the Scots. There was an inquisition into the land at Lancaster in 1367 that stated "there is at Liverpull a certain Castle, the foss whereof and the herbage are worth by the year 2s., and there is a dovehouse under the Castle which is worth by the year 6s.8d."

Sir Richard Molyneux was appointed constable of the castle in 1440, and the title was made hereditary five years later. In 1442, the castle was strengthened by the addition of a fourth tower in the south-east corner to the cost of £46 13s 10¼d. On 2 October 1559 the castle is stated as being "in utter ruin and decay". The Great Tower had a slate roof and it was suggested to be used as storage for the court rolls. It was decided that the castle would undergo repairs costing around £150, "otherwaies it were a grate defacement unto the said towne of Litherpole".

During the reign of Charles I the castle was seized by Lord Derby. In 1644, Prince Rupert and his men took the castle, which was later taken back by Sir John Moore. Protestant supporters of William of Orange seized the castle in 1689. On 5 March 1704, the burgesses obtained a lease for the castle and its site from the Crown for fifty years. William Molyneux, 4th Viscount Molyneux, disputed this as he still claimed hereditary constableship. This delayed the settlement of the lease until 1726, when the last remaining ruins of the castle were removed. In 1707/08 a Mr. Serocold a London surveyor planning the wet dock suggested the castles stone would save money by reusing it to build the dock, it is possible this plan went ahead. Finally, in 1715, an act was passed to demolish the castle and build a church in its place. Construction of St George's church began on the site of the old castle and the church was consecrated in 1734. By 1825, the church had been pulled down and a new one built in its place. In 1899, the church was demolished and the Victoria Monument was erected in 1902. In 1976 excavation of the south side of Castle Street was conducted before the construction of the Crown Courts building, which was built in the style of a castle.

Replica

At Lever Park in Rivington (near Chorley), William Lever built a scale replica of Liverpool Castle, a folly known as Rivington Castle. Building started in 1912. The replica, which was not completed, was based on a conjectural reconstruction of the castle prepared by E. W. Cox in 1892.

References

Further reading

Royden, Mike (2017), 'Liverpool Castle' in Tales from the 'Pool, Creative Dreams,

External links
History of Norman Liverpool and West Derby Castle
Liverpool Castle - History and Then and Now photos

Castles in Lancashire
History of Liverpool
Military history of Liverpool
Former buildings and structures in Liverpool
Buildings and structures demolished in 1726
Buildings and structures completed in the 13th century
13th-century establishments in England
18th-century disestablishments in England
Demolished buildings and structures in Liverpool